Montoison is a commune in the Drôme department in southeastern France.

Population

Personalities
 Paulin Gagne (8 or 9 June 1808 – August 1876), French poet, essayist, lawyer, politician, inventor and eccentric, was born in Montoison.

See also
Communes of the Drôme department

References

Communes of Drôme